The Hinkelstein culture  is a Neolithic archaeological culture situated in  Rhine-Main and Rhenish Hesse, Germany.
It is a Megalithic culture, part of the wider  Linear Pottery horizon, dating to approximately the 50th to 49th century BC.

The culture's name is due to a suggestion of Karl Koehl of Worms (1900). Hinkelstein is the term for menhir in the local Hessian dialect, after a menhir discovered in 1866 in Monsheim. Hinkel is a Hessian term for "chicken"; the Standard German name for menhirs, Hünenstein "giants' stone", having  sometimes been jokingly mutated into Hühnerstein "chicken-stone".

References

Jean-Paul Farrugia: Hinkelstein, explication d'une seriation (Coll Interreg. Neol. 1997), S. 467-517.
C. Koehl: Neue Stein- und frühmetallzeitliche Gräberfunde bei Worms. Korrbl. DAG 31, 1900, 137-142.
E. Probst: Deutschland in der Steinzeit, München 1986
H. Spatz: Hinkelstein und Großgartach - Kontinuität und Wandel. In AiD 3/1996 S. 8-13

Archaeological cultures of Central Europe
Archaeological cultures in Germany
Neolithic cultures of Europe
5th millennium BC